Charlotte "Charley" Baginsky is a British business executive. She is the Chief Executive Officer of Liberal Judaism (UK) since January 2021.

Early life and education
Baginsky was born in England, the daughter of William Baginsky and Mary Baginsky (née Yates). She studied Theology at Cambridge University and  King’s College London, before working and studying for several years in Israel. She was ordained as a rabbi at Leo Baeck College in London.

Career
From March to December 2020 Baginsky was, with Shelley Shocolinsky-Dwyer, Liberal Judaism's joint interim Director. Prior to that she was, from 2016 to 2020, Liberal Judaism's Director of Strategy and Partnerships and also (part-time) the Rabbi for South Bucks Jewish Community.

For ten years she was the Rabbi for Kingston Liberal Synagogue.

Family life
She has three children.

References

External links
 Liberal Judaism: Charley Baginsky
 Jewish Women's Archive: Charley Baginsky

Year of birth missing (living people)
Living people
21st-century English rabbis
Alumni of King's College London
Alumni of Leo Baeck College
Alumni of the University of Cambridge
British chief executives
British Liberal rabbis
Liberal Judaism (United Kingdom)
Women chief executives
Women rabbis